Marko Car (born 21 October 1985) is a Croatian professional basketball player for UBSC Graz of the Austrian Basketball Superliga.

External links

 Profile at Adriatic Basket
 Profile at basketball.eurobasket.com
Profile at interperformances.com

1985 births
Living people
ABA League players
BSC Fürstenfeld Panthers players
Competitors at the 2009 Mediterranean Games
Croatian men's basketball players
KK Cedevita players
KK Split players
KK Zadar players
KK Zagreb players
Kolossos Rodou B.C. players
Mediterranean Games gold medalists for Croatia
Mediterranean Games medalists in basketball
Shooting guards